Isaac Kamalu is the Rivers State Commissioner for Finance after taking over from Fred Kpakol in 2019. He was the immediate past Rivers State Commissioner of Budget and Economic Planning since December 2015. He is a member of the Rivers State People's Democratic Party.

Isaac Kamalu hails from Alode community. He served as chief whip and member of the Rivers State House of Assembly for the constituency of Eleme from 2007 to 2011.

References

Living people
Commissioners of ministries of Rivers State
People from Eleme (local government area)
Rivers State Peoples Democratic Party politicians
Members of the Rivers State House of Assembly
First Wike Executive Council
Year of birth missing (living people)